The BAT F.K.27 was a two-seater sporting biplane designed by Frederick Koolhoven and built by the British Aerial Transport Company Limited (BAT) in 1918.

Design and development
The F.K.27 was a sesquiplane two-seater with side-by-side seating staggered en echelon to starboard. The two bay sesquiplane wings were arranged conventionally, with the lower mainplane attached to the bottom of the fuselage and the upper mainplane supported on cabane struts above the fuselage and solid built up inter-plane struts. The fixed under-carriage consisted of strut supported main-wheels and a sprung tailskid at the rear extremity of the fuselage. Powered by a  ABC Wasp II, the F.K.27 was also aerobatic.

Specifications (F.K. 27)

Notes

References

External links

Koolhoven aircraft

1910s British aircraft
Sesquiplanes
F.K.27
F.K.27
Single-engined tractor aircraft
Aircraft first flown in 1918